Simon Moon may refer to:
Simon Moon (Frasier), a minor character in the television sitcom Frasier
Simon Moon, an anarchistic character in The Illuminatus! Trilogy novels from 1975
Simon Moon, former owner of the ED2k links site ShareReactor
Simon on the Moon, the alias of Swedish songwriter Simon Hessman